Edwige Lawson (born May 14, 1979), also Edwige Lawson-Wade, is a French former professional women's basketball player.  

A point guard, Lawson started her professional career at the age of 17. She has played in Bordeaux, Aix-en-Provence, and Valenciennes in France. She has also played in the WNBA for the San Antonio Silver Stars, New York Liberty, the Houston Comets and the Seattle Storm, and also for CSKA Moscow in the Russian Superleague.  Lawson was also the starting point guard for the France national women's basketball team, with whom she won a silver medal at the 2012 London Olympic Games. Her resume includes three French championships, two Russian championships and three Euroleague titles (two with Valenciennes and one with CSKA Samara) and one European Championship with France.  Edwige was the three-point competition champion at the 2008 FIBA Europe All-Star game. 

Lawson is married to professional basketball coach James Wade. They have a son, James "Jet" Wade III. She is of Beninese descent through her father.

Career

Europe
 1994–1995:  CJM Bourges Basket
 1995–1997:  Waïti Bordeaux
 1997–2001:  ASPTT Aix-en-Provence
 2001–2004:  US Valenciennes Olympic
 2004–2007:  VBM-SGAU Samara
 2007–2009:  CSKA Moscow
 2009–2010:  WBC Spartak Moscow Region
 2010–2011:   Ros Casares
 2011–2013:  Basket Lattes MA

References

External links
 Edwige Lawson's Official Website

1979 births
Living people
Basketball players at the 2000 Summer Olympics
Basketball players at the 2012 Summer Olympics
Black French sportspeople
French expatriate basketball people in Russia
French expatriate basketball people in Spain
French expatriate basketball people in the United States
French sportspeople of Beninese descent
French women's basketball players
Knights of the Ordre national du Mérite
Medalists at the 2012 Summer Olympics
New York Liberty players
Olympic basketball players of France
Olympic medalists in basketball
Olympic silver medalists for France
Point guards
Seattle Storm players
Sportspeople from Rennes